Henry Cary Dangar (4 June 1830 – 25 April 1917) was a colonial Australian politician. He served two terms in the New South Wales Legislative Assembly during the 1870s and 1880s.

Biography
Dangar was born in Port Stephens, New South Wales, second son of Henry Dangar. Dangar was educated at Trinity College, Cambridge, where he graduated M.A. in 1857. He entered at the Inner Temple in August 1849, and was called to the bar in June 1854.

Dangar was elected to the New South Wales Legislative Assembly on 16 December 1874 for West Sydney, a seat he held until 12 October 1877. 
He then represented East Sydney from 17 November 1880	to 23 November 1882.
On 9 October 1883 he was appointed to the New South Wales Legislative Council, a position he held until his death.

Dangar was a member of the Australian Jockey Club for 42 years. On 19 September 1865, Dangar married Lucy Lamb.

Dangar died of hemiplegia in Potts Point, Sydney, on 25 April 1917, aged 86. His estate was valued at £48,312 for probate.

References

1830 births
1917 deaths
Alumni of Trinity College, Cambridge
Members of the Inner Temple
People from the Hunter Region
Members of the New South Wales Legislative Assembly
Members of the New South Wales Legislative Council